KUAP (89.7 FM, Hot 89.7) is a station broadcasting an urban contemporary music format. Licensed to Pine Bluff, Arkansas, United States, the station is owned by the board of trustees of the UA/UAPB and is based on the campus of University of Arkansas Pine Bluff.

References

External links
 

UAP
Radio stations established in 1983
Urban contemporary radio stations in the United States
University of Arkansas at Pine Bluff